Loppersum is a village of almost 1,500 inhabitants in the municipality of Hinte, East Frisia, Germany. Most of the working people have a job in the neighbouring city of Emden.

References

Other external links
Loppersum (History of Loppersum, in German, PDF, 826 kB)

Towns and villages in East Frisia
Aurich (district)